Fadil Avdullah Vokrri (23 July 1960 – 9 June 2018) was a Kosovan football player and administrator.

Arguably one of the greatest Kosovan footballers, he was the president of the Football Federation of Kosovo from 16 February 2008, until his death on 9 June 2018.

Early life
Born in Podujevo, SFR Yugoslavia, Vokrri was known for his Diego Maradona-like approach with quick movement and strong shooting (where he established his strong shooting reputation at FC Prishtina). He won a number of international caps for the former Yugoslavia in the mid-1980s and was unlucky to not win more caps where he was one of Yugoslavia's favourite football talents. He played in a star-studded lineup that included Agim Cana, Edmond Rugova and Fadil Muriqi, as well as other Kosovan players who were part of the Golden Generation in the 1980s. Vokrri's FC Prishtina went on to beat Red Star Belgrade at the Red Star Stadium and record a historic away victory for the Kosovan team.

Club career
Vokrri scored a total of 121 goals and had 363 club appearances, he began his career at the age of 16 years old at Llapi. He then moved to Prishtina in 1980 and played there until 1986, scoring 55 goals and making 172 appearances. Vokrri was very successful with Partizan from Belgrade where he scored 18 goals and had 55 appearances. He was key to both the team claiming the 1986–87 Yugoslav First League title, and their successful run in the 1988–89 Yugoslav Cup, notably scoring in the final as Partizan won 6–1 against Velež Mostar.

In between the two trophy successes, Italian club Juventus showed interest in signing Vokrri. However, as he had not completed the then-compulsory two years' military service, he was unable to travel abroad, and so had to turn down the offer. He eventually completed the requirements for military service while playing for Partizan, fulfilling light tasks during the week around training and in between matches.

He also played for Nîmes Olympique, Fenerbahçe where he played for the successful coach Guus Hiddink. Vokrri was a favourite of Fenerbahçe fans but was not as productive as he was with FC Prishtina and Partizan because of his older age.

Post-retirement

After the Kosovo War ended, Vokrri returned to his country and became the sporting director of Prishtina. On 16 February 2008, he was elected as the president of the Football Federation of Kosovo for a four-year mandate.

Personal life
Vokrri and his wife Edita had two sons, Gramozi and Albert, and a daughter named Albana. He had a degree in the Faculty of Management and Business. Apart from his native Albanian, he was also fluent in French, Serbo-Croatian and Turkish. On 17 May 2018, he earned his Albanian passport.

Death
On 9 June 2018, Vokrri suffered a heart attack while he was exercising and died on his way to the emergency room. Later that day, the Prishtina City Stadium was renamed to the Fadil Vokrri Stadium in his honour.

Vokrri was given a state funeral on 10 June 2018 and was buried at the Pristina City Cemetery. President of Kosovo Hashim Thaçi marked the day as a national day of mourning, with all flags lowered at half mast across Kosovo, and at embassies all over the world.

Career statistics

Club

International

Scores and results list Yugoslavia's goal tally first, score column indicates score after each Vokrri goal.

Honours
Partizan
Yugoslav First League: 1986–87
Yugoslav Cup: 1988–89

References

External links
Profile at Football Federation of Kosovo 
Career history at Football Association of Serbia 

1960 births
2018 deaths
Sportspeople from Podujevo
Yugoslav footballers
Yugoslavia international footballers
Albanian men's footballers
Kosovan men's footballers
Yugoslav expatriate footballers
Kosovan expatriate footballers
Expatriate footballers in France
Yugoslav expatriate sportspeople in France
Kosovan expatriate sportspeople in France
Expatriate footballers in Turkey
Yugoslav expatriate sportspeople in Turkey
Kosovan expatriate sportspeople in Turkey
Association football forwards
Yugoslav First League players
FC Prishtina players
FK Partizan players
Ligue 2 players
Nîmes Olympique players
Süper Lig players
Fenerbahçe S.K. footballers
Bourges 18 players
Montluçon Football players